Lamoille or La Moille may refer to:

Places in the United States

Illinois
 La Moille, Illinois, a village
 Lamoille Township, Bureau County, Illinois

Iowa
 LaMoille, Iowa, an unincorporated community

Minnesota
 Lamoille, Minnesota, an unincorporated community

Nevada
 Lamoille, Nevada, a census designated place
 Lamoille Canyon, a valley in the Ruby Mountains
 Lamoille Canyon Road, a scenic byway through the canyon
 Lamoille Lake, a glacial tarn in the canyon
 Lamoille Organization Camp, a camping facility
 Nevada State Route 227, signed partially as Lamoille Highway

Vermont
 Lamoille County, Vermont
 Lamoille River, a river in northern Vermont and the namesake of all other places with the name
 Lamoille River Route 15-A Bridge, a steel and concrete bridge crossing the river
 Lamoille Union High School, a public secondary school in Hyde Park